Katherine Brooks Waddell (born June 16, 1938) is a Virginia politician who served in the Virginia House of Delegates. She represented the 68th District, which includes portions of the City of Richmond and Chesterfield County.

Electoral history

References

External links
Official Biography - Virginia General Assembly
Campaign Website

1938 births
Living people
Members of the Virginia House of Delegates
Women state legislators in Virginia
Virginia Independents
Virginia Republicans
21st-century American politicians
21st-century American women politicians
Politicians from Danville, Virginia
Politicians from Richmond, Virginia
Averett University alumni